Hazara Australians or Australian Hazaras are Australians who have Hazara ancestry. The Hazaras are an ethnic group native to, and primarily residing in, the mountainous region of Hazarajat in central Afghanistan. Many Hazara Australians have also migrated from Pakistan. The Hazara Council of Australia is an organization formed by the Hazara community of Australia. Hazaras constitute one of the largest ethnic groups of asylum seekers in Australia

According to the 2016 Australian census, 21.9% of Afghan-born Australians recorded their ancestry as Hazara and 33.9% listed Hazaragi as their main language, making Hazaras the second largest group in both categories.

History 
Before 1980, relatively few Hazaras came to Australia for educational purposes. During the 1980s Soviet–Afghan War and the 1990s civil war, over 5,000 Hazaras arrived in Australia. The Hazara Australian community has produced a sizable number of individuals notable in many fields, including law, medicine, engineering, teaching and business.

Demography 
The largest portion of Hazara Australians reside in the LGAs of Dandenong, Ryde (North Ryde, Macquarie Park, Marsfield, Shepparton, Mildura and Top Ryde), The Hills Shire (Castle Hill, Cherrybrook, and Kellyville), Blacktown (Glenwood, Parklea, Stanhope Gardens and Bella Vista) and Sutherland Shire (Miranda). Ethnic Hazaras are believed to reside in suburbs such as Auburn and Merrylands.

Language 
Most Hazara Australians are fluent in English but their first language is Dari (Persian) in Hazaragi dialect.

Media 
Arman Monthly is a magazine distributed nationwide which is published by the Hazara community. The 2003 Australian documentary film Molly & Mobarak is based on a Hazara asylum seeker who enters Australia, falls in love with a local girl and faces possible deportation as his temporary visa nears expiration.

Notable people 
 Hussain Sadiqi
 Ali Ahmadi
 Rahmat Akbari

See also 
 Australians
 Hazara diaspora
 Hazara Indonesians
 Hazaras in Europe
 Afghan Australians
 Pakistani Australians

References 

 
Australia
Afghan Australian
Pakistani diaspora in Australia